Parviz Tanavoli (born 1937) is an Iranian sculptor, painter, educator, and art historian. He is a pioneer within the Saqqakhaneh school, a neo-traditionalist art movement. Tanavoli has been one of the most expensive Iranian artists in sales. Tanavoli series of sculpture work  are displayed in prestigious museums and public places, such as the British Museum, Metropolitan Museum of Art, Hamline University, Aga Khan Museum, and as public art in the city of Vancouver. Additionally Tanavoli has written extensively on this history of Persian art and Persian crafts. Since 1989, Tanavoli holds dual nationality and has lived and worked both in Tehran, and Horseshoe Bay in West Vancouver, British Columbia.

Early life and education 
Parviz Tanavoli was born 24 March 1937 in Tehran. In 1952, he started his education at the Tehran School of Fine Arts (now part of the University of Tehran). He continued his studies in Italy at the Academy of Fine Arts in Carrara (Italian: Accademia di Belle Arti di Carrara) in 1956 to 1957; as well as at Brera Academy (Italian: Accademia di Belle Arti di Brera) in Milan from 1958 to 1959 . He studied under sculptor Mariano Marini.

Upon graduating from the Brera Academy in 1959, he returned to Iran in 1960 and taught sculpting at the College of Decorative Arts in Tehran.

Career

Teaching 
From February 1961 to 1964, Tanavoli taught sculpture for three years at the Minneapolis College of Art and Design, as a guest of art collector Abby Grey. He then returned to Iran and assumed the directorship of the sculpture department at the Tehran University (now University of Tehran), a position he held for 18 years until 1979, when he retired from his teaching duties.

Artwork 

He belongs to the Saqqakhaneh group of artists who, according to the scholar Karim Emami, share a common popular aesthetic. He has been influenced heavily by his country's history and culture and traditions, and has always been fascinated with locksmithing. Tanavoli was once cultural advisor to the Shahbanu Farah Pahlavi. Tanavoli is known for his es, three dimensional representations of the Persian word for 'nothing', . Composed of three Persian characters in the style of nasta'liq, the three letters he, ye and če are combined to produce the word .\

In 2003, Tanavoli turned his Tehran house into the "Museum of Parviz Tanavoli" showcasing his personal art collection, which was only open for a few months due to political issues in Iran.

Rasht 29 Club 
In 1967, Tanavoli, Kamran Diba, and Roxana Saba (daughter of Abolhasan Saba) founded the Rasht 29 Club on a northern street near the Amirkabir University of Technology (formerly the Tehran Polytechnic). Rasht 29 Club was named after the street address, and it was a popular hangout amongst artists of the time including Marcos Grigorian, Hossein Zenderoudi, Sadegh Tabrizi, Faramarz Pilaram, Sohrab Sepehri, Massoud Arabshahi, Yadollah Royai, Nader Naderpour, Reza Baraheni, Esmail Shahroudi, Ahmadreza Ahmadi, Bijan Elahi, Ebrahim Golestan, Hageer Daruish, Kamran Shirdel, Sadeq Chubak, Karl Schlamminger, and others.

Sales 
Tanavoli's work has been auctioned around the world leading to overall sales of over $9 million, making him the most expensive living Iranian artist. In 2008, his work, The Wall (Oh Persepolis), an almost 2-meter tall bronze sculpture covered in incomprehensible hieroglyphs fetched $2.84 million USD at a Dubai Christie's sale, which was an auction record for an artist of Middle Eastern origins.

Exhibitions
His solo exhibition was in 2019 at the West Vancouver Art Museum entitled "Oh Nightingale". Prior to that, he had another solo exhibition in 2017 at the Tehran Museum of Contemporary Art based on his Lions works and Lion collection.

In 2015, after four decades, Davis Museum at Wellesley College organized the first solo exhibition of Tanavoli's work in the US.

In 2003  he had a major retrospective at the Tehran Museum of Contemporary Art. Prior to that he had held solo exhibitions in Austria, Italy, Germany, United States and Britain. Tanavoli has been in group exhibitions internationally.

His work has been displayed at the Tate Modern, British Museum, Metropolitan Museum of Art, the Grey Art Gallery - New York University, the Isfahan City Center, Nelson Rockefeller Collection, New York, Olympic Park, Seoul, South Korea, the Royal Museum of Jordan, the Museum of Modern Art, Vienna, Museum of Modern Art, New York, Walker Art Center, Minneapolis, Hamline University, St. Paul and Shiraz University, Iran.

Politics and art
In 2005, he created a small piece of sculpture called Heech in a Cage to protest the conditions of the American-held prisoners at Guantanamo Bay detainment camp and in 2006 began work on his piece to honour the victims of the Israeli-Lebanon war. 

A day before Tanavoli was due to speak at the British Museum in 2016, authorities in Iran confiscated his passport, preventing him from leaving the country, accusing him of "disturbing the public peace". Tanavoli explained that "I have not done anything wrong. I spent the whole day at the passport office but no one told me anything, nor did anyone at the airport. I'm not a political person, I'm merely an artist."

Honors and legacy 

In 2015, the biographical documentary film was released, Parviz Tanavoli: Poetry in Bronze, directed by Terrence Turner and produced by Timothy Turner and Tandis Tanavoli.

In October 2020, the former Mina Street in the Niavaran neighborhood was renamed Parviz Tanavoli by the municipality of Tehran.

Bibliography

Authored or co-authored by Tanavoli 
Tanavoli has authored over forty publications, dating back over four decades. Among these are:

On Tanavoli 
Books, catalogs, and magazines on Parviz Tanavoli

See also 

 Iranian handicrafts
 Iranian modern and contemporary art

References

Further reading

External links 

 
 Video: 1970s Parviz Tanavoli, Iranian Sculptor, from Kinolibrary Archive Film Collections on YouTube
 Video: 1978 Interview with Parviz Tanavoli, Iranian Sculptor in HD, from Kinolibrary Archive Film Collections on YouTube

1937 births
Living people
Iranian art historians
Iranian emigrants to Canada
Iranian sculptors
Iranian contemporary artists
Academic staff of the University of Tehran
Brera Academy alumni
Artists from Tehran
Artists from British Columbia
People from West Vancouver
Canadian art historians
Canadian sculptors
Canadian contemporary artists